Jumbo is a 2008 Indian 3D computer-animated adventure live-action film directed by Kompin Kemgumnird, produced by Percept Picture Company and features the voices of Akshay Kumar, Lara Dutta, Dimple Kapadia, Rajpal Yadav, Asrani, and Gulshan Grover. Jayveer Singh aka Jumbo, a little elephant, which tries to find his Father and the journey of finding his father made him a war elephant. The film is a Hindi remake and  Hindi dubbed version of the 2006 Thai film Khan Kluay, which is based on "Chao Praya Prab Hongsawadee" by Ariya Jintapanichkarn.

The film was dubbed and released in Hindi and English where the creative direction on the film was done by Mayur Puri. 

Jumbo was released worldwide on Christmas Day 2008, but performed poorly at the box office, grossing . Kumar was reportedly paid  for the dubbing and two promotional songs.

In 2011 A direct to DVD sequel titled Jumbo 2: The Return of the Big Elephant was released.

Plot 
The film starts with actor Akshay Kumar singing the song "Everything's Gonna Be All Right"  which is shown by him to a kid in a movie theater. The kid asks him why he is saying "everything's gonna be alright". Akshay then narrates the story of Jumbo from his childhood.

The story starts with Devi naming her son as Jayveer Singh aka Jumbo in a jungle in the Shakti Nagar kingdom on the border of India and China. The other members of the herd ask who thought of this name and in a parallel a battle between Shauryagarh and Shakti Nagar where Jumbo's father, Yudhveer Singh is currently fighting in.

His mother never reveals any details of his father, and neither do the rest of the elephants in the herd. He is a happy go lucky elephant, who loves to play with the other animals of the jungle. Occasionally he would be confronted by the other elephants of the herd, who would bully him on the history of his father. Tired of being teased about his father's cowardice in some war, he confronts his mom again, who somehow manages to rubbish the topic. 

One night he learns that an army of Shauryagarh has entered the jungle, and they plan an overnight stay. In the hope of finding his father, Jumbo sets out to the camp, and manages to find a tent that houses the royal elephant of that army aka Bakhtavar Singh. He goes in and politely asks Bakhtavar if he has heard about Yudhveer. Suddenly, he becomes violent, and Jumbo starts running for cover. In the meanwhile, the soldiers standing outside see Jumbo running out of the tent and try to capture it. 

Jumbo manages to go into the tent of prince Vikramaditya. Vikramaditya then saves Jumbo from the soldiers. It is then revealed that Vikramaditya is the captured prince of Shakti Nagar. Vikramaditya calms Jumbo down by simply placing a hand on his head and assuring him nothing is going to happen to him. The army chief aka Senapati Gattu comes to ask if Jumbo is in his tent to which he denies. When he returns to his tent, he sees that Jumbo has fled the scene.

After running away from the camp, Jumbo realises that he is separated from his mother and is lost in the jungle. He wanders in the jungle for a while, where he meets Sonia, a cute pink elephant. she takes him to her village and makes him meet a wise old Mahout who is the guardian of Sonia. He sees that Jumbo is badly wounded and tend to him. One day, Shauryagarh soldiers come to the village for grains and food. During this commotion, Jumbo, who is now all well, sneaks off into the woods. Sonia sees this and follows him. While searching for Jumbo, she is attacked by animals and Jumbo saves her, injuring himself again. the Mahout is very much impressed by Jumbo's bravery. Jumbo, still in search of his father, tries to talk to Dildar Yadav. Dilbar reveals that Yudhveer was the King's warrior elephant and says that he must be in the palace only.

Jumbo excited wants to go to the palace, but its shown that only warrior elephants can go in the palace. So he joins the Mahout's elephant troop who are training to be warriors for the competition to become a royal elephant. Jumbo who is weak at first, gains a lot of strength and grows up to become a very strong elephant who overpowers all the other elephant. Now all grown up, Jumbo and Sonia, who is shown to be Jumbo's girlfriend, are enjoying their alone time during a village festival. The Shauryagarh soldiers are still fending off the village. but this time Jumbo fights off everyone and defeats the soldiers.

The next day, the Mahout and his elephants, including Jumbo, are leaving for the Shakti Nagar's royal elephant warrior competition. Jumbo is selected for the final round and is initially winning, but his mother is also present in the competition as a spectator and screams his name. The soldiers hold her down and this is seen by Jumbo and he fight off the soldiers. The King is intrigued Jumbo and walks upto him and clams him down just like Vikramaditya did when Jumbo was a child. The King is revealed to be Vikramaditya himself all grown up. He announces that Jumbo is his new royal warrior elephant

At night, Jumbo's mother finally tells him the story of his father,  and how he never returned after a war. They sneak into a tent which houses the ex-royal elephants, hoping to locate Jumbo's father. There they meet an old royal elephant who knows Jumbo's father. He then narrates what happened in the battle. He tells them that Jumbo's father was killed by Bakhtavar after a fierce battle.

Jumbo then set out with King Vikramaditya to avenge the death of his father. Jumbo shows the same strength and skill which his father possessed in his days. They challenge Bakhtavar for a one-on-one combat. Then follows a fierce battle between Jumbo and Bakhtavar, in which Jumbo kills Bakhtavar in the same manner that his father was killed. In the end, Akshay, again emphasises his words, "everything's gonna be all right, when we walk side by side".

Voice cast 
 Akshay Kumar as Jayveer Singh "Jumbo" the elephant/Himself (narrator)
 Ashar Shaikh as Baby Jayveer Singh "Jumbo"
 Lara Dutta as Sonia
 Vaishnavi Shetty as Baby Sonia 
 Rajpal Yadav as Dildar Yadav
 Dimple Kapadia as Devi, Jumbo's mother 
 Amar Babaria as Rajkumar Vikramaditya
 Asrani as Senapati Gattu
 Gulshan Grover as Bakhtavar Singh
 Purav Bhandare as The Kid

Music 
The soundtrack was composed and directed by Ram Sampath. The lyrics were penned by Israr Ansari, Munna Dhiman, Asif Ali Beg. The album was released by T-Series.

Track listing

Release 
Jumbo had a limited release in 500 screens, due to most of the screen space taken by Rab Ne Bana Di Jodi and Ghajini.

Reception

Box office 
The film opened to a poor response, grossing  in its opening week.  Within three weeks the film had grossed .

Critical response 
Taran Adarsh from Bollywood Hungama rated it 3/5 and said "JUMBO is a sweet, sincere and simple film that works. Who knows, it may spring a surprise this Christmas. Recommended for kids from 6 to 60". Gaurav Malani of Economic Times gave it 2/5 saying "Whether you are an Akshay Kumar aficionado or an animation genre fan, Jumbo won't appeal much to either. This time the animation format is enhanced but the storytelling is obsolete". Khaled Mohamed from Hindustan Times gave it 1.5 out 5 and said "Forget comparisons with the Disney classics Bambi or Fantasia, or the more recent Finding Nemo and Madagascars. With round-the-clock exposure to the best animation in the world, you doubt even if pre-tweens will be enthralled by the caricatured animal life and the flat palette colours".

Sequel 
The sequel Jumbo 2: The Return of the Big Elephant was released on 21 October 2011. It received negative reviews

References

External links 

 

2008 films
Indian animated films
2000s Hindi-language films
Animated films about elephants
Indian remakes of Thai films
Indian children's fantasy films
Indian historical action films
Indian historical adventure films
Indian historical drama films
Indian historical fantasy films
Indian animated fantasy films